Nazxul are an Australian black metal band which formed in 1993. They issued two studio albums, Totem (March 1995) and Iconoclast (July 2009). In March 2021, their most recent studio album titled Irkalla was released with the lineup being Adrian Henderson on guitar, Lachlan Mitchell on keyboards and guitar, John McLaughlin on drums and Dalibor Backovic on vocals and bass guitar.

History

Early years and Totem (1993–1997) 

Nazxul were formed in 1993 by guitarist Adrian Henderson, keyboards player-guitarist Lachlan Mitchell, former Mortal Sin and Slaughter Lord drummer Steve Hughes and Dalibor Backovic on vocals and bass guitar. Originally envisioned as a mysterious studio-bound project, the group only appeared in publicity photos as shadowy figures or draped facelessly in cloaks.

In 1994 a self-titled demo album appeared through Vampire Records. According to Voltage Media's reporter it was "met with a mixture of astonishment and ultimate praise from critics, allegiance and enthusiasm by extreme music disciples, and revulsion by the ignorant and myopic." Soon after guitarist Greg Morelli, from Sydney thrash band Grungeon, joined the fold and work began on the band's first album 'Totem' which went on to become a cult classic. Though reviews were mixed, it was ultimately praised throughout the underground as a unique and powerful debut.

"Black Seed" (1998-2007) and touring 

Further material was written, during which time Backovic departed and two new members joined, singer Morte from an avant-garde black metal group called Bestianity and guitarist Rev. Kriss Hades from the notorious Sydney death metal band Sadistik Exekution who were experiencing one of their well-known self-imposed dormant periods. This line-up produced the EP Black Seed in 1998 and late in the year played live for the first time at a show in Sydney, with Henderson moving to bass guitar.

Hughes left the group after this to pursue a career in stand-up comedy and soon left Australia to live in the UK. His replacement was Peter Kostic from Sydney rock band Front End Loader. Almost immediately, Nazxul was booked to support Finnish extreme metal group Impaled Nazarene on part of an Australian tour. In a remarkable turn of events, Kostic's other band was then approached to tour with British rock group Skunk Anansie over the same period but declined due to the drummer's commitment to Nazxul; the Skunk Anansie tour was in turn cancelled when the group suddenly split up. Morte was fired after this tour and Backovic returned for Nazxul's appearance at the Metal for the Brain festival. In the meantime, Black Seed was re-released with several live tracks recorded during the tour added to the track listing. The cover was slightly amended with the iconography rendered in gold instead of green.

After playing a final show for the year all activity from Nazxul then appeared to cease abruptly. Kostic joined Regurgitator in 2000 and the Hard Ons in 2001. Hades recorded two more albums with Sadistik Exekution before embarking on a solo career. Mitchell continued his work as a professional sound engineer / producer and in late 2001 formed a rock band Brace with several former members of Canberra group Henry's Anger. Backovic left Nazxul in 2000 to pursue a career in the film industry as a screenplay writer and director. In 2002, Sydney black metal label Decius released a limited-edition live album (titled simply Live) on 12" vinyl. The recording was of the group's 1999 Metal for the Brain performance. A year later, the Nazxul track "Apostasies Legions Arise, Xul!" appeared on a compilation release from Hiberica Records along with tracks from American band Krieg, Necroplasma from Sweden and Goat Semen from Peru.

The band was not at an end however. Four tracks of dark ambience, recorded by Henderson, Mitchell and Morelli, were released on a split EP with Melek Tha in 2004. The same year, Nazxul regrouped with a new line-up that included Henderson, Morelli and Mitchell plus two former members of Wollongong black metal band Secretain, Daniel Lomas (vocals) and Luke Mills (guitar), and drummer Tim Yatras from another Wollongong band called Battalion. Originally booked to tour with Dimmu Borgir, the Norwegian band cancelled its visit but several months later Nazxul undertook a tour with Adelaide based gothic metal band Virgin Black instead. Nazxul then became dormant for some time since. Mills continued to play in various black metal bands and Yatras was the drummer with Lord between 2005 and May 2009.

"Iconoclast" (2008–present) and touring 

In 2008 Nazxul reformed and were listed as the national support to the Australian leg of Mayhem's tour; this tour was cancelled however. The band completed work on the long-awaited Iconoclast album, first mooted in 1998, during the year. Greg Morelli died in a motorcycle accident on 20 November 2008 in North Strathfield. He had just completed his guitar parts for the album, before his death. Nazxul asked those who listen to "Oath (Fides Resurrectio)" to think of Morelli: it is performed in his honour.

Iconoclast was released in July 2009 by German label Eisenwald Records. Guitarist Petar Peric from Infernal Method replaced the late Morelli, and drummer John McLaughlin replaced Tim Yatras.

International touring went ahead at the end of 2009 with shows in England, Germany, the Netherlands, Belgium and Russia.

Nazxul's third album titled Irkalla was released in March 2021.

Discography

Studio albums
Totem (22 March 1995)
Iconoclast (27 July 2009)
Irkalla (22 March 2021)

Live albums
Live (2002)

Demos
Nazxul (1994)

EPs
Black Seed (1998)
Quickener of the Dead (2010)

Split albums
4 Spears in God's Ribs (2003)
Develish Purification (2004)—with Melek-Tha

References

External links
 
 
 

Musical groups established in 1993
New South Wales musical groups
Australian heavy metal musical groups
Australian black metal musical groups
1993 establishments in Australia